Issa Daoud El-Issa (his surname also spelt al Issa and Elissa) was a Palestinian Christian poet and journalist. With his cousin Yousef El-Issa, he founded and edited the biweekly newspaper Filastin in 1911, based in his hometown of Jaffa. Filastin became one of the most prominent and long running in the country at the time, and was dedicated to the cause of the Arab Orthodox in their struggle with the Greek-Orthodox Patriarchate in Jerusalem. The newspaper was the country's fiercest and most consistent critic of the Zionist movement, denouncing it as a threat to Palestine's Arab population. It helped shape Palestinian identity and was shut down several times by the Ottoman and British authorities.

Biography
Exiled during World War I, al-Issa became chief of the Arab Kingdom of Syria's royal court in Damascus during King Faisal's government that lasted five months. During that time, he required the publishers of Damascus-based newspapers to dedicate half of their newspaper columns to the Palestinian cause as prerequisite to receiving their monthly salaries. 

In June 1928, Al-Issa was elected to the 7th Congress of the Arab Executive Committee (AEC) as a representative of Jaffa. During his time on the committee, he joined the National Defense Party, the opposition to Hajj Amin al-Husayni's sympathizers on the AEC. Al-Issa hosted several Arab Christian-Orthodox conferences in Mandatory Palestine and Transjordan. 

His son Raja El-Issa succeeded him as the publisher of Filastin. On 29 June 1949, al-Issa died in Beirut, Lebanon. Issa once experienced an assassination attempt in August 1936.

See also
Falastin newspaper

Palestinian Christians

Further reading
Les mémoires de 'Issa al-'Issa: journaliste et intellectuel palestinien (1878-1949)
From Ambivalence to Hostility: The Arabic Newspaper Filastin and Zionism, 1911–1914

Notes

References

Bibliography
 
 
Tamari, S., 2014, Issa al Issa’s Unorthodox Orthodoxy: Banned in Jerusalem, Permitted in Jaffa, Jerusalem Quarterly, Institute for Palestine Studies

1878 births
1950 deaths
Arab people in Mandatory Palestine
Eastern Orthodox Christians from Palestine
Palestinian Christians
People from Jaffa
Palestinian journalists
Palestinian newspaper founders
Palestinian nationalists